Gallowgate Central railway station was located in Glasgow, Scotland and served the Calton area of that city via the Glasgow City and District Railway.  Gallowgate Central was on the  branch of the modern North Clyde line, now closed.

References 
In the poem Skimbleshanks by T S Eliot, written in 1939 as part of Old Possum's Book of Practical Cats, the night mail train finally arrives in Gallowgate.

Notes

Sources 
 
 
 

Disused railway stations in Glasgow
Railway stations in Great Britain opened in 1892
Railway stations in Great Britain closed in 1917
Former North British Railway stations
Bridgeton–Calton–Dalmarnock